The Bay Glory is a giant cantilevered observation wheel located at Qianhai Bay, Shenzhen, China. It is operated by OCT and opened to the public on 18 April 2021.

Design 

It has 28 gondolas, each gondola has a net area of 16.8 m2 and can seat a maximum of 25 passengers. Passengers can see the scenery of Qianhai Bay and Pearl River estuary Lingdingyang from the gondola.

Transportation 
Metro
  - Linhai (Exit B2)

Drive
Drive through Baohua South Road and enter the Underground Parking of OCT Oh Bay

References

External links
 Official website of OCT Oh Bay

2021 establishments in China
Amusement rides introduced in 2021
Ferris wheels in China
Buildings and structures in Shenzhen
Tourist attractions in Shenzhen
Bao'an District